Brišnik may refer to:

 Donji Brišnik, a village near Tomislavgrad, Bosnia and Herzegovina
 Gornji Brišnik, a village nearTomislavgrad, Bosnia and Herzegovina